is a city located in Shizuoka Prefecture, Japan. , the city has an estimated population of 145,032 in 59,480 households, and a population density of 750 persons per km². Fujieda is a member of the World Health Organization’s Alliance for Healthy Cities  (AFHC).

Geography
Fujieda is located in the Shida Plateau in central Shizuoka Prefecture between the Abe River and the Ōi River. The area enjoys a warm maritime climate with hot, humid summers and mild, cool winters.

Neighboring municipalities
Shizuoka Prefecture
Shizuoka
Yaizu
Shimada

Demographics
Per Japanese census data, the population of Fujieda grown rapidly over the past 50 years.

Climate
The city has a climate characterized by characterized by hot and humid summers, and relatively mild winters (Köppen climate classification Cfa).  The average annual temperature in Fujieda is 15.9 °C. The average annual rainfall is 2159 mm with September as the wettest month. The temperatures are highest on average in August, at around 26.8 °C, and lowest in January, at around 5.7 °C.

History
Under the Tokugawa shogunate of Edo period Japan, much of the area of present-day Fujieda was part of Tanaka Domain, and its castle formed part of the eastern outlying fortifications of Sunpu. The town also developed as Fujieda-juku, a post town on the Tōkaidō highway connecting Edo with Kyoto.

During the cadastral reform of the early Meiji period in 1889, Fujieda-juku became Fujieda Town within Shida District Shizuoka Prefecture. Fujieda Station on the Tōkaidō Main Line railway opened on April 16, 1889, leading to development of the surrounding area. On March 31, 1954, Fujieda merged with neighboring Aoshima Town and four neighboring villages to form Fujieda City. Setoya Village merged on February 15, 1955 and Hirohata Village on April 1, 1957.

On January 1, 2009, the neighboring town of Okabe (from Shida District) was merged into Fujieda. Shida District was dissolved as a result of this merger.

Government
Fujieda has a mayor-council form of government with a directly elected mayor and a unicameral city legislature of 22 members.

Economy
Fujieda is primarily a bedroom community for nearby Shizuoka. The local economy is dominated by agriculture (tea, strawberry, rice, shiitake) and light manufacturing, including pharmaceuticals, beverages, and food processing.

Education
Fujieda has 17 public elementary schools and ten public junior high schools operated by the city government. and three public high schools operated by the Shizuoka Prefectural Board of Education. There are also two private middle schools and  three private high schools. The prefectural also operates one special education school for disabled children. In addition, Shizuoka Sangyo University has a campus in Fujieda, and the agricultural fields for Shizuoka University are also located in the city.

Sport
Fujieda is represented in the J. League of football by its local club Fujieda MYFC. In the 1980s and 1990s the city was represented in the Japan Soccer League and former Japan Football League by local clubs Fujieda City Hall SC, which still competes in the prefectural divisions, and Chuo Bohan SC/Fujieda Blux, which moved out of town in 1994 to become Avispa Fukuoka.

Transportation

Railway
 Central Japan Railway Company -  Tōkaidō Main Line

Highway
 - Fujieda Bypass, Okabe Bypass

Sister City relations
 - Penrith, New South Wales, Australia, from November 3, 1984.
 - Yangju, Gyeonggi Province, South Korea, since August 24, 2009

Local attractions
Tanaka Castle
Shida Gunga ruins, National Historic Site
Utsunoya Pass, a National Historic Site
Gardens of Renge-ji temple

Notable people from Fujieda
Kunio Ogawa, novelist
Shizuo Fujieda, novelist
Shin Asahina, professional soccer player
Toshiya Ishii, professional soccer player
Tatsuya Ishikawa, professional soccer player
Kentaro Ohi, professional soccer player
Hiroshi Nanami, professional soccer player
Yoshikazu Suzuki, professional soccer player
Masashi Nakayama, professional soccer player
Makoto Hasebe, professional soccer player
Nobuhisa Yamada, professional soccer player
Takeshi Watanabe, professional soccer player
Ryu Okada, professional soccer player
Motoyuki Akahori, professional baseball player

References

External links

 Fujieda City official website 

 
Cities in Shizuoka Prefecture